The 1984–85 Bulgarian Cup was the 45th season of the Bulgarian Cup. CSKA Sofia won the competition, beating Levski Sofia 2–1 in the final at the Vasil Levski National Stadium in Sofia.

First round

|-
!colspan=5 style="background-color:#D0F0C0;" |1984

|}

Second round

|-
!colspan=5 style="background-color:#D0F0C0;" |1984

|}

Third round
In this round include the four teams, who participated in the European tournaments (CSKA, Levski, Botev Plovdiv and Sliven).

|-
!colspan=5 style="background-color:#D0F0C0;" |January 1985

|}

Quarter-finals

|-
!colspan=5 style="background-color:#D0F0C0;" |26 January / 16 February 1985

|}

Semi-finals

|-
!colspan=5 style="background-color:#D0F0C0;" |28 February / 13 March 1985

|}

Final

Details

References

1984-85
1984–85 domestic association football cups
Cup